Ali Abdi Aware is a Somali politician.

Biography
Ali Abdi Awaare hails from the autonomous Puntland region in northeastern Somalia Born on 15 May 1957 in Bandar Beyla. He belongs to the Majeerteen Harti Darod clan.

Awaare has over the years held various positions in the Puntland government, including as the State Minister of the Presidency for International Relations and Social Affairs. In 2008, he ran for president in that year's Puntland elections. He was eliminated in the first round of voting, receiving 4.55% of ballots.

In 2013, Aware presented himself as a candidate in the 2014 Puntland presidential elections, which took place on 8 January 2014 in Garowe. He was eliminated in the first round of voting, with former Prime Minister of Somalia Abdiweli Mohamed Ali declared the winner.

See also
Ali Haji Warsame
Ibrahim Artan Ismail
Shire Haji Farah

References

Living people
Ethnic Somali people
Somalian politicians
Somalian Muslims
Place of birth missing (living people)
1957 births